The Dream Catcher is a 1986 young adult dystopian fiction novel by Monica Hughes.

References

1986 Canadian novels
1986 fantasy novels
Young adult fantasy novels
Canadian young adult novels
Dystopian novels